Argentina and Indonesia established diplomatic relations in 1956. Since then, bilateral relations between both countries have become increasingly more strategic. According to Argentine Ambassador to Indonesian Javier A. Sanz de Urquiza, Indonesia has been a "true friend of Argentina" over the Falkland Islands sovereignty dispute. Argentina has an embassy in Jakarta, while Indonesia has an embassy in Buenos Aires. Both countries say they share the same values regarding the international order, and the same aspiration to defend the developing nations' interest in international forum. Both countries are members of  Group of 77, the G-20 major economies, the G20 developing nations, and Forum of East Asia-Latin America Cooperation.

History

The diplomatic relations between Argentina and Indonesia was established on 30 July 1956. During the Falklands War in 1982, Indonesia supported Argentina's sovereignty claim to the Falkland Islands over the claims of the United Kingdom.

High level visits
In September 2012, Argentine Foreign Minister Héctor Marcos Timerman visited Jakarta, Indonesia. In January 2013, Argentine President Cristina Fernández de Kirchner visited Indonesia and paid a courtesy call to Indonesian President Susilo Bambang Yudhoyono.

Trade and commerce

Indonesia is the second-largest destination for Argentine exports to Asia after China, and the largest one in Southeast Asia. While Argentina is South America's second-largest importer of Indonesian products after Brazil. In overall trade, Indonesia is Argentina's fourth-largest trading partner in Asia. The volume of trade between Indonesia and Argentina rose from US$632.47 million in 2007 to almost reached US$2 billion in 2011. The balance of trade is heavily in favor of Argentina, as every year Indonesia buys more than $1 billion worth of soya bean oil cakes from Argentina.

See also 
 Foreign relations of Argentina 
 Foreign relations of Indonesia

Notes

External links 
   Argentine Ministry of Foreign Relations: list of bilateral treaties with Indonesia (in Spanish only)
  Indonesian embassy in Buenos Aires (in English, Indonesian and Spanish)

 
Indonesia
Bilateral relations of Indonesia